Overpass is a studio album by the jazz acoustic bassist Marc Johnson. ECM released the album on 27 August 2021.

Background
This is his first album in some 10 years. Overpass is a rare bass-only album; it contains eight compositions recorded in Säo Paulo, Brazil during 2018. Five tracks are originals; three tracks are covers, which Johnson selected with great care: Miles Davis’ "Nardis" and Alex North’s "Love Theme from Spartacus" were staples of the Bill Evans’ repertoire. Johnson and his wife Eliane Elias produced the record.

Johnson said that several things led him to record this album, commenting, " I’ve been experimenting with different ways of playing alone with the bass to make music and came up with a couple of different meditative-type, pattern-oriented concepts. That started the idea of doing a whole record like that some time. I’ve been experimenting with that and throwing them on different album projects for different people, like with John Abercrombie. There are some moments in a track here or there, where I dive into something like that, but I had never tried to do a whole piece from start to finish with just that being the impetus of thing."

Reception

Jeff Tamarkin writing for the JazzTimes stated, "Each bassist who’s taken the solo plunge has approached it with a different methodology, but one guiding principle behind most of their creations is the need to coax the listener’s brain into filling in the considerable spaces left by the absence of others, to give the illusion of fullness. Most of us simply aren’t accustomed to hearing an unaccompanied upright acoustic bass for a long stretch of time. Johnson is well aware of that, and he takes care to maintain continually involving conversations with himself throughout these eight pieces." Nigel Jarrett of the Jazz Journal wrote, "Overpass is so called to describe a mini-survey of charts with which Johnson has been associated in one way or another. It’s his first solo album, and it presents a jazz master on peak form and home alone." Karl Ackermann of All About Jazz added, "The virtuoso bassist Marc Johnson has kept a relatively low profile as a leader. Overpass marks Johnson's return to Manfred Eicher's label after ten years, and is his first solo album... The music of Marc Johnson, original and repurposed, mingles traditional jazz, vivid structures, and improvisation, and an intuitively unique style develops. It's quite a feat to generate so much appealing sound from a single, double bass, but Johnson is talented enough to make that kind of magic happen."

Track listing

Personnel
Marc Johnson – bass

References

2021 albums
Marc Johnson (musician) albums
ECM Records albums